The Fairbanks North Star Borough School District is a public school district based in Fairbanks, Alaska (USA). With a student enrollment of slightly over 14,000, it is the state's second largest public school district.

Schools

Senior high schools

Grades 9-12
Hutchison High School (Fairbanks)
Lathrop High School (Fairbanks)
North Pole High School (North Pole)
West Valley High School (Fairbanks)

Junior/Senior High Schools
Grades 7-12
Ben Eielson Junior/Senior High School (Eielson AFB)

Middle schools
Grades 7-8
North Pole Middle School (North Pole)
Randy Smith Middle School (Fairbanks)
Ryan Middle School (Fairbanks)
Tanana Middle School (Fairbanks)

Elementary/Middle Schools
Grades K-8
Barnette Magnet School (Fairbanks)
Two Rivers School (Fairbanks)
Joy Elementary (Fairbanks)

Elementary schools
Grades 3-6
Crawford Elementary School (Eielson AFB)
Grades K-6
Anne Wien Elementary School (Fairbanks)
Arctic Light Elementary School (Fort Wainwright)
Midnight Sun Elementary School (Fairbanks)
Denali Elementary School (Fairbanks)
Hunter Elementary School (Fairbanks)
Ladd Elementary School (Fairbanks)
Nordale Elementary School (Fairbanks)
North Pole Elementary School (North Pole)
Pearl Creek Elementary School (Fairbanks)
Salcha Elementary School (Salcha)
Ticasuk Brown Elementary School (Fairbanks)
University Park Elementary School (Fairbanks)
Weller Elementary School  (Fairbanks)
Woodriver Elementary School (Fairbanks)
Grades K-2
Anderson Elementary School (Eielson AFB)

Charter schools
Grades 7-12
Effie Kokrine Charter School (Fairbanks)
Star of the North Secondary Charter School
North Pole Academy (North Pole)
Career Education Center (Fairbanks)
Grades K-8
Chinook Charter School
The Watershed School

Alternative Programs
Guided Independent Studies Home Schooling Program

Enrollment
2007-2008 School Year: 14,227 Students
2006-2007 School Year: 15,017 Students
2005-2006 School Year: 14,677 Students
2004-2005 School Year: 14,754 Students
2003-2004 School Year: 14,810 Students

Demographics
There were a total of 14,227 students enrolled in the Fairbanks North Star Borough School District during the 2007–2008 school year. Of these, 14,031 were enrolled in grades K-12 and 196 were pre-elementary (early childhood) students. The racial makeup of the district was 66.65% White, 14.45% Alaska Native, 8.34% African American, 5.48% Hispanic, 4.05% Asian, 0.79% Native Hawaiian/Pacific Islander, and 0.24% American Indian.

See also
List of school districts in Alaska

References

External links

School districts in Alaska
Education in Fairbanks, Alaska
Education in Fairbanks North Star Borough, Alaska